The 2010–11 season is the 4th season in the Football League played by Dagenham & Redbridge F.C., an English football club based in Dagenham, Greater London. It is their first ever season in Football League One after promotion from Football League Two in 2010 via the play-offs. The season covers the period from 1 July 2010 to 30 June 2011.

Match results 
League positions are sourced from Statto, while the remaining contents of each table are sourced from the references in the "Ref" column.

League table

League One

FA Cup

League Cup

Football League Trophy

Player details 

Numbers in parentheses denote appearances as substitute.
Players with names struck through and marked  left the club during the playing season.
Players with names in italics and marked * were on loan from another club for the whole of their season with Dagenham & Redbridge.
Players listed with no appearances have been in the matchday squad but only as unused substitutes.
Key to positions: GK – Goalkeeper; DF – Defender; MF – Midfielder; FW – Forward

Transfers

In

Out

References 

Dagenham and Redbridge
Dagenham & Redbridge F.C. seasons